The Historical Thesaurus of English (HTE) is the largest thesaurus in the world. It is called a historical thesaurus as it arranges the whole vocabulary of English, from the earliest written records in Old English to the present, according to the first documented occurrence of a word in the entire history of the English language. The HTE was conceived and begun in 1965 by the English Language & Linguistics department of the University of Glasgow, who have ever since continued to compile the thesaurus. From the 1980s onwards the project was moved from paper-based records to a computer database.

Today, the HTE is available to the public online, but a print version, the Historical Thesaurus of the Oxford English Dictionary (HTOED), was published in 2009.

Main project: The Historical Thesaurus of English (HTE) 
The Historical Thesaurus of English (HTE) is a complete database of all the words in the Oxford English Dictionary and other dictionaries (including Old English), arranged by semantic field and date. In this way, the HTE arranges the whole vocabulary of English, from the earliest written records in Old English to the present, alongside dates of use.

It is the first historical thesaurus to be compiled for any of the world's languages and contains 800,000 meanings for 600,000 words, within 230,000 categories.  As the HTE website states, "in addition to providing hitherto unavailable information for linguistic and textual scholars, the Historical Thesaurus online is a rich resource for students of social and cultural history, showing how concepts developed through the words that refer to them."

Structure 
The work is divided into three main sections: the External World, the Mind, and Society. These are broken down into successively narrower domains. The text eventually discriminates more than 236,000 categories.
The second order categories are:

I. The External World
 
 The earth
 Life
 Health and disease
 People
 Animals
 Plants
 Food and drink
 Textiles and clothing
 Physical sensation
 Matter
 Existence and causation
 Space
 Time
 Movement
 Action/operation
 Relative properties
 The supernatural

II. The Mind
 
 Mental capacity
 Attention and judgment
 Goodness and badness
 Emotion
 Will
 Possession
 Language

III. Society
 
 Society and the community
 Inhabiting and dwelling
 Armed hostility
 Authority
 Law
 Morality
 Education
 Faith
 Communication
 Travel and travelling
 Occupation and work
 Trade and finance
 Leisure

History 
The ambitious project was announced at a 1965 meeting of the Philological Society by its originator, Michael Samuels.  Work on the HTE started in the same year.

In 2017, the University of Glasgow was awarded the Queen's Anniversary Prize for Higher Education for the HTE.

A second edition of the online HTE is currently in progress and is expected to be launched in late 2020. Work is released on the freely-available HTE website when available.

Print edition: Historical Thesaurus of the Oxford English Dictionary (HTOED) 

On 22 October 2009, after 44 years of work, version 1.0 of the HTE was published by Oxford University Press in a two-volume slipcased set as the Historical Thesaurus of the Oxford English Dictionary (HTOED). The two hardcover volumes together total nearly 4,500 pages.

References

External links
  

Classification systems
History of the English language
Knowledge representation
Language histories
Thesauri (lexicography)
Works derived from the Oxford English Dictionary